Joyce Ann Karlin Fahey (born January 5, 1951) is an American lawyer and politician. She served as both a federal prosecutor and a Los Angeles County Superior Court judge. She is known for having sentenced Soon Ja Du, the merchant who killed 15 year old Latasha Harlins with a fatal shot to the back of her head, to only five years' probation and 400 hours of community service, with no jail time. The sentence was widely condemned, including by the LA County District Attorney and black community leaders in Los Angeles, and is often cited as a catalyst for the 1992 Los Angeles riots.

Early life and education
Karlin was born in Caracas, Venezuela. During her childhood, Karlin lived in several countries including Italy, Germany and Argentina. Her family moved to Chicago. Karlin received a degree from the Loyola University Chicago School of Law in 1974.

Career
Karlin was employed by defense attorneys in Chicago and Los Angeles. She served as an assistant United States Attorney in Los Angeles. She presided over the case of former Drug Enforcement Administration (DEA) agent Darnell Garcia.

Karlin became a Superior Court judge in 1991 and that year, she presided over the controversial voluntary manslaughter case involving the death of Latasha Harlins. Karlin's light sentencing was seen in contrast to her more severe sentencing of a Glendale man for kicking a dog a week later, and was met with outrage and protest from the African-American community. It is the opinion of historians that the decision fueled the racial unrest the black community was already feeling in the aftermath of the Rodney King beating and possibly contributed to the 1992 Los Angeles riots. The Los Angeles County District Attorney issued a "blanket affidavit policy", that disallowed Karlin from judging felony cases "involving violent crimes." Karlin defended her ruling stating that "The orange juice has nothing to do with anything. A woman was severely beaten and responded to the beating.″ adding that 15 year old Harlins was shot "in the heat of battle".

In 1992, an effort to recall Karlin narrowly failed. Karlin was elected in spring 1992 to California's Superior Court. She received 51% of the vote, defeating four other candidates. In 1997, Karlin retired from her position as a judge. She was later elected to the Manhattan Beach, California city council and in 2002 served a rotation as mayor, per the system used for Manhattan Beach. Since retiring from the bench she has used her husband, Superior Court Judge William F. Fahey's surname.

In 2003, a rival candidate for City Council formally filed a claim of invasion of privacy against Karlin when she obtained the candidate's social security number and used to subsequently released details of her opponent's education to the public. Superior Court Judge Willaim Willett granted Karlin's motion to dismiss citing California's anti-SLAPP law.

References

Living people
California state court judges
Mayors of places in California
Women city councillors in California
1951 births
People from Caracas
People from Manhattan Beach, California
Loyola University Chicago School of Law alumni
Superior court judges in the United States
Venezuelan emigrants to the United States
20th-century American judges
20th-century American women judges
21st-century American politicians
21st-century American women politicians
20th-century American lawyers
California city council members
Women mayors of places in California